Roger Federer defeated Robin Söderling in the final, 6–1, 7–6(7–1), 6–4 to win the men's singles tennis title at the 2009 French Open. It was his first and his only French Open title and 14th major title overall, completing the career Grand Slam and equaling Pete Sampras' then-record of men's singles major titles. It was Federer's fourth consecutive French Open final, having lost the previous three to Rafael Nadal. Söderling became the first Scandinavian major finalist since Thomas Johansson at the 2002 Australian Open.

Rafael Nadal was the four-time defending champion, but was defeated in the fourth round by Söderling. It was Nadal's first defeat at the French Open, having won the title in all four of his previous appearances since debuting in 2005 and winning his first 31 matches. His loss guaranteed a maiden French Open champion. In the ten-year span from 2005 to 2014, this was the only edition of the French Open not won by Nadal.

Until the 2016 Wimbledon Championships, this was the last major where Novak Djokovic failed to reach the quarterfinals. He lost to Philipp Kohlschreiber in the third round.

This was the last major appearance for 2004 French Open champion and former world No. 5 Gastón Gaudio, and the last French Open for and former world No. 1 and two-time major champion Marat Safin.

Seeds

Qualifying draw

Draw

Finals

Top half

Section 1

Section 2

Section 3

Section 4

Bottom half

Section 5

Section 6

Section 7

Section 8

References

External links
Official Roland Garros 2009 Men's Singles Draw
Main Draw
2009 French Open – Men's draws and results at the International Tennis Federation

Men's Singles
French Open by year – Men's singles
French Open - Men's Singles